Brown Estate Vineyards is a winery in Napa Valley, California, United States.  It produces zinfandel, cabernet sauvignon, chardonnay, and petite sirah varieties. Founded in 1995 by siblings Deneen, David and Coral Brown, Brown Estate produced its first Napa Valley zinfandel in 1996 after the family had been farming grapes and selling them to established winemakers.  It is the first and only Black-owned estate in Napa Valley.

Early history 
In 1980, parents Bassett Brown, originally from Jamaica, and Marcela Abrahams Brown, originally from Panama, acquired  in the Chiles Valley AVA of the Napa Valley. Abandoned for ten years prior, the land and its two structures—an 1859 stone and redwood barn and an 1885 Queen Anne Victorian home—were derelict. The senior Browns cut roads and installed plumbing and electricity, for which they received an award from the Napa County Historical Society for their restoration of the residence structure. The Chiles Valley microclimate, characterized by extreme temperature shifts throughout the course of each day, proved perfectly suited to cultivating zinfandel grapes, and the Brown family's fruit soon gained tremendous popularity among zinfandel producers such as Green & Red and T-Vine Cellars, both of whom purchased Brown Estate fruit for many years. As well, the Browns sold cabernet sauvignon to the famed Mike Grgich. It was through a series of apprenticeships with winemakers who were working with his fruit that David Brown, who by then had been farming his family's vineyards for five years, began learning the art and science of winemaking.

In the mid-1990s, as a result of rising demand for their fruit, Deneen and David, then both residing on the vineyard property, made the decision to produce wine under their own label. Because they had no winery facility on site, they secured a custom crush contract with Rombauer Vineyards in Saint Helena, and for six years they produced their wines at the Rombauer facility. On January 29, 2000, Brown Estate debuted their first two vintages of Napa Valley zinfandel, 1996 and 1997, at the annual Zinfandel Advocates and Producers (ZAP) tasting at Fort Mason in San Francisco. ZAP is the largest single varietal wine tasting event in the world, and the Brown offerings were very well received by the trade and public alike, thereby establishing Brown Estate as a winery to watch in the arena of Napa Valley zinfandel. Simultaneously, in the January 31, 2000 issue of the Wine Spectator, the 1997 Brown Estate zinfandel received a score of 91 points.

Fire 
In June 2000, a fire broke out at the warehouse facility where Brown's wine library and a recently bottled 1998 vintage were stored. With the exception of sixteen bottles - two that went to wine critic Robert M. Parker, Jr. for review, two that went to Christie's for auction, and twelve that the Browns had stored at home - all of their 1998 zinfandel was destroyed, as were the remaining cases of their first two vintages. The lost 1998 vintage left the Browns out of the zinfandel market for one whole year, a devastating setback that was mitigated only by the help of restaurant and retail accounts who held space on their wine lists and shelves for the next vintage of Brown zin. In order to bridge that gap, the Browns accelerated the release of their 1999 Napa Valley zinfandel, which they showed at ZAP in 2001. The previous month, in December 2000, Parker gave the Brown 1998 zinfandel a score of 90, noting that his review was "of academic interest only" since all of the wine had perished in the fire. The loss of the 1998 vintage has kept Brown Estate's Napa Valley zinfandel bottlings on a perennially early release schedule.

Winery and cave construction 
As production grew, Brown expanded beyond the Rombauer facility. Winery construction began in summer of 2002, and by September of that year, a derelict barn was repurposed as an on-site wine production facility. Beginning in April 2004, the Brown Estate added a wine cave, blasting through a granite hillside with dynamite.

Milestones 
In November 2010, the Browns released the world's first hashtagged wine, their 2009 Napa Valley Zinfandel. Subsequent vintages of this wine bore the #brownzin hashtag.

In April 2017, Brown Downtown Napa opened on downtown Napa's First Street corridor.

References

External links 

Wineries in Napa Valley
St. Helena, California
1995 establishments in California